Balawali railway station is a railway station on Moradabad–Ambala line under the Moradabad railway division of Northern Railway zone. This is situated at Forest Range-1, Balawali in Bijnor district of the Indian state of Uttar Pradesh.

References

Railway stations in Bijnor district
Moradabad railway division